St. Xavier's High School, Bhuj is state board school in the city of Bhuj, Gujarat, India. This school is managed by the Catholic Minority Community. The ownership of this Institute is with the Syro-Malabar Catholic Diocese of Rajkot and run by the Reverend Fathers of Rajkot Diocese and Reverend Sisters of CMC (Congregation of Mother of Carmel). It is a co-educational school which runs from Junior K.G to 12th Standard. It is an English medium school, however emphasis is also given to Hindi and the local language Gujarati. It is recognized by the Department of Education, Gujarat. School achieves cent percent results

Location 
St. Xavier's High School, Bhuj is located at 27, NR Regional Transport Office (RTO), RD, Bhuj. RTO is the landmark for this school.

Syllabus 
All text books are in accordance with the Government of Gujarat State. This school organizes various extra-curricular activities for the students. Every year there is a cultural week with various activities and events and also a Science week. The school takes its students out on excursions. Independence day, Teachers' day and other such occasions are celebrated at the school.

References

External links 
 St. Xavier's High School, Bhuj

High schools and secondary schools in Gujarat
Christian schools in Gujarat
Bhuj